Fort Meigs was a United States fortification along the Maumee River in what is now Perrysburg, Ohio during the War of 1812. The British Army, supported by Tecumseh's Confederacy, failed to capture the fort during the siege of Fort Meigs. It is named in honor of Ohio governor Return J. Meigs Jr., for his support in providing General William Henry Harrison with militia and supplies for the line of forts along the Old Northwest frontier.

History
Construction of the fort started in February 1813 by soldiers under the command of General William Henry Harrison (future president) at a site where present-day Perrysburg, Ohio developed. It was to provide a supply depot and staging point for US military operations in Canada that would also command the rapids of the Maumee River. The remnants of the British Fort Miami were across the river downstream, to the northeast. The winter climate was harsh, and the landscape unforgiving. A U.S. sentry froze to death during his two hours of guard duty. The walls were constructed using logs cut to a 15-foot length, partially buried in the ground, then protected by a steep earthen slope thrown against the logs to strengthen them against bombardment. An embankment against the interior side provided a parapet. When completed, the fort was the largest wooden walled fortification in North America.

The first siege: On May 1, 1813, British allied forces, under General Henry Proctor and Chief Tecumseh, opened a bombardment of the fort, which had mustered 1,200 regulars and militia, and laid siege. Reinforcements reached the fort on May 4, increasing its garrison to 2,800. Early on the morning of May 5, a detachment from Clay's brigade under Colonel William Dudley landed from boats on the north bank of the river, stormed the British batteries on the north bank and spiked the guns. Coming under fire from Indians in the woods, part of the Kentuckian force pursued Tecumseh's men, who led them deeper into the forest. In the woods, the disorganized Kentuckians suffered heavy casualties in confused fighting. Nearly 550 were captured, and of Dudley's 866 officers and men, only 150 returned to the fort. This became known as "Dudley's Massacre" or "Dudley's Defeat".

The Shawnee, Delaware (Lenape) and other Native American warriors attacked any wood-gathering parties sent out from the fort. Harrison held out against the British by using a pair of 14-foot high embankments ("traverses") thrown up inside the walls along the length of the interior to absorb the incoming British shells. Proctor abandoned the siege on May 9, 1813 and retreated to Detroit.

The second siege: Having mobilized the garrison into an army, Harrison left General Green Clay in command of the fort, much reduced in size from its original layout. In July 1813, the British attempted to appease their allies by again besieging Fort Meigs. The Indians staged a mock battle to lure the garrison out. The Americans, however, saw through the ploy. After the failed siege attempt, the British moved on to Fort Stephenson, where Fremont, Ohio stands today. That attack also failed, causing heavy British losses and forcing their retreat to Canada. Once the British had retreated from the area for good, General Harrison ordered Fort Meigs dismantled. In its place, a small, square stockade was constructed to serve as a supply base and to protect the Maumee rapids. The Treaty of Fort Meigs was signed there in 1817, and the post was abandoned that same year.

In 1864, brothers Timothy and Thomas Hayes became the owners of the land on which the fort had stood and were instrumental in preserving it in memory and honor of the men who fought the battles. The heirs of the Hayes brothers sold the property to the state in 1907.  On September 1, 1908, the large obelisk monument that can be seen from outside the fort was dedicated by a local veteran of the Civil War to the fallen soldiers of Fort Meigs.  The Ohio Historical Society reconstructed the fort in the late 1960s, and its museum, featuring numerous artifacts uncovered during excavation in connection with the rebuilding, opened in 1974. It is a National Historic Landmark.

Memorial

As of 2021, Fort Meigs is the site of an Ohio State Memorial in Perrysburg, Ohio. The 65-acre (263,000 m2) park includes the full-size 10-acre replica of the 1813 fort. Between 2000 and 2003 its wooden palisades were rebuilt with fresh timbers, the seven blockhouses were repaired, and exhibits or facilities built inside four of them. The $6.2 million renovation project also saw the museum replaced by a Museum and Education Center of 14,000 square feet that features 3,000 square feet of exhibits on Ohio's role in the War of 1812, classrooms for student and adult workshops, and office and maintenance areas. The museum exhibit "Legacy of Freedom: Fort Meigs and the War of 1812" focuses on the themes of era, conflict, understanding and remembrance. These sections place the War of 1812 into the context of the times and explain Fort Meigs' role in the conflict.

The original grand traverse is preserved within the interior of the fort, although erosion has reduced it from its original 14-foot height, and a reverse traverse was constructed to the original specifications by the OHS.  Located at the corner of a nearby cemetery are the remains of an original mortar position laid by the British for use during the siege.

Re-enactments

Several re-enactments take place at Fort Meigs each year. They include:
 First Siege, a battle re-enactment portraying the events of the siege of Fort Meigs in May 1813, complete with American and British infantry and artillery. This event is held on Memorial Day weekend and is followed on Monday by a ceremony commemorating the fallen soldiers.
 Muster on the Maumee, a "timeline event" held at the fort on Father's Day weekend, includes military re-enactors from ancient Roman soldiers to the modern-era soldier.
 Independence Day, a re-enactment portraying the events on the Fourth of July in 1813. It includes toasts and an 18-gun salute.
 Garrison Ghost Walk, an event held on the last two weekends in October; a re-enactor guides visitors through the dark fort to tell ghost stories.

References

External links

Fort Meigs Historic Site

Fort Tours: Fort Meigs

Meigs
Meigs
National Historic Landmarks in Ohio
Military and war museums in Ohio
Museums in Wood County, Ohio
National Register of Historic Places in Wood County, Ohio
Native American history of Ohio
Museums of the War of 1812
Ohio History Connection
Protected areas of Wood County, Ohio
Parks in Ohio
1813 establishments in Ohio
Meigs
Perrysburg, Ohio